Katharina Brauren (21 April 1910 – 25 December 1998) was a German actress. She appeared in more than 80 films and television shows between 1937 and 1997.

Selected filmography
 Madame Bovary (1937)
 Third from the Right (1950)
  Abundance of Life (1950)
 The Major and the Bulls (1955)
 Under the Thousand Lanterns (1952)
 Toxi (1952)
 The Twins from Immenhof (1973)
 Spring in Immenhof (1974)
 November Cats (1986)
 Ödipussi (1988)

References

External links

1910 births
1998 deaths
German film actresses
People from Grabow